Michel Borne (September 19, 1784 – 1843 or later) was a merchant and political figure in Canada East. He represented Rimouski in the Legislative Assembly of the Province of Canada from 1841 to 1842.

He was born in Quebec City, the son of George Borne, a native of France, and Marie-Françoise Letellier. In 1808, Borne married Angélique Paquette. In 1828, he was an unsuccessful candidate for the Quebec Upper Town seat in the assembly for Lower Canada, losing to Thomas Lee. Borne served on the municipal council for Quebec City from 1840 to 1842. He resigned his seat in the assembly in 1843 to allow Robert Baldwin to stand for election.

References 
 

1784 births
Year of death missing
Members of the Legislative Assembly of the Province of Canada from Canada East
Quebec City councillors